The 2018 Indonesian Earthquake may refer to:

 2018 West Java earthquake - 23 January - 5.9
 2018 Lombok earthquake - July-August cluster - 6.4 foreshock, 6.9 mainshock, 5.9 aftershock, 6.4 aftershock
 19 August 2018 Lombok earthquake - 6.9
 2018 Sulawesi earthquake and tsunami - 28 September - 6.1 foreshock, 7.5 mainshock
 2018 East Java earthquake - 11 October - 6.0